Serbian organized crime or Serbian mafia are various criminal organizations based in Serbia or composed of ethnic Serbs in the former Yugoslavia and Serbian diaspora. The organizations are primarily involved in smuggling, arms trafficking, heists, drug trafficking, protection rackets, and illegal gambling. The mafia is composed of several major organized groups, which in turn have wider networks throughout Europe.
 
It includes some highly successful groups, including one of the largest cocaine import enterprises in  Europe "Groupa Amerika", and the "YACS" Crime Group, out of NYC. The "Pink Panthers" is responsible for some of the biggest heists ever committed. Its origin dates back to SFRY, which had very low crime rate, as criminals were allowed to live peacefully in Yugoslavia as long as they restricted their operations to abroad, and then bring the stolen goods and capital back to be spent at home. The Serbian mafia gave many Serbs a perceived way out of the economic disaster that occurred in the country following the implementation of internationally imposed sanctions against Serbia during the Yugoslav Wars. Serbian criminals have been recruited into state security forces, a notable example being Milorad "Legija" Ulemek, a commander in Arkan's Tigers, which was re-labelled as the JSO (Red Berets) after the war.

Serbian mafia is made up of several major international criminal organizations, specializes for cocaine trade, each of them has annual income of several billions. Two of them are declared as the most powerful in Europe, (Cartel "Los Balcanes" and "Group America").

It has established a direct connection with the majority of cocaine producers, purchasing drugs directly from South American producers, selling them only to wholesalers operating in Europe.

During the period when the cigarette mafia operated, Serbian mafia earned about 100 billion dollars.

Serbian mafia today, is estimated to earn €62 billion annually, their annual earnings on the cocaine market in Europe are worth €5.4 billion Euros. According to the DEA, alone cartel Tito y Dino is estimated at 23 billion euros on cocaine market. In June 2013, the world renowned magazine Forbes published a list of the richest mafia bosses in the world, Serbian drug lord Darko Šarić, was in a high fifth place, he is estimated to have assets worth of 27 billion dollars.

According to estimates by the DEA and Europol, Serbian cartel known as "Los Balcanes", send about  500 tons of cocaine annually to the Old Continent. The boss of everything was the Serb, Dejan Stanimirovic, who was wanted by more than 30 countries.

Ethnic Serb organized crime groups are organized horizontally; higher-ranked members are not necessarily coordinated by any leader.

History
Ljubomir Magaš, aka Ljuba Zemunac, was known as the "Godfather" of the Serbian mafia during the 1970s and 1980s. He and his gang operated in Germany and Italy during this time. He was assassinated in 1986 by his rival Goran "Majmun" Vuković.

Vukasin Despotović & Dario Ivišić operated in the Netherlands and became one of the most powerful gangsters through his elimination of rivals while working as a hitman and took over the drug trade in the Netherlands. The drug that was smuggled was cocaine from Colombia and "Joca Amsterdam" became known as the "Cocaine King". He worked for "Duja" Bećirović as an underboss and later lived in Bulgaria where he successfully smuggled drugs until his arrest in 2002. Upon returning to Serbia, he took over companies by force, utilizing the Surčin clan, (one of three then most powerful "clans" of Belgrade). He was later accused of organizing the 2008 assassination of Ivo Pukanić, a Croatian journalist killed by a car bomb, but was acquitted by a Serbian court due to a lack of evidence for his involvement.

Željko "Arkan" Ražnatović was a successful bank robber in Western Europe in the 1970s. He had convictions and warrants in Belgium, the Netherlands, Sweden, Germany, Austria, Switzerland and Italy. However, he managed to escape from several prisons and then made connections with several known criminals from Yugoslavia during his time there. In the 1980s he returned to Serbia where he became involved with illegal businesses and led the Red Star Belgrade supporters' group "Delije Sever" ("Ultras").

The real breakthrough for criminal organizations in Serbia occurred in the early 1990s, when the Yugoslav Wars erupted in first Croatia and then Bosnia. The Serbs, Croats and Bosniaks fought over territory in Croatia and Bosnia and Herzegovina. International sanctions were imposed on Serbia starting in May 1992 and Serbia became economically isolated. This prompted the breakthrough for criminal organizations. Desperate for money, many former soldiers and youngsters turned to a life of crime.

In 1992, members of the "Peca" gang were arrested in a massive police-operation. One of the gang's members was Dušan Spasojević, who later became the head of the Zemun clan. A young mobster from the Belgrade suburb of Voždovac, Aleksandar "Knele" Knežević, was murdered in October of that year, prompting a brief, but violent Gang War in Belgrade.

Arkan was the founder and leader of the Serb Volunteer Guard (Arkan's Tigers), a Serb paramilitary unit that fought during the Yugoslav Wars. The unit's members were mostly newly recruited Red Star Belgrade hooligans and gangsters from Serbia. Those who joined the unit profited on the battlefields by looting and stealing. Arkan later founded the Party of Serbian Unity in 1993. By the time he returned home, he had become the most powerful member of the Serbian Mafia. He married singer Svetlana "Ceca" Ražnatović.

Since the days of SFRY, the mafia has sometimes been protected in exchange for political favors, thus having a direct connection to their activities. Stane Dolanc, a Slovene, instrumentalized the mafia for political assassinations abroad. In the 90s, the Mafia profited by smuggling cigarettes, alcohol and oil. Businessman Stanko Subotić was the person that made the largest profit at this time, as cigarettes and oil were in such high demand because of the sanctions. Subotić's net worth is estimated to be €650 million. After Milošević's fall from power, Subotić maintained connections with Montenegrin President Milo Đukanović, who granted him political favours.

From 1994 to 2000, illegal cigarette smuggling in Italy was operated by the Serbian mafia in coordination with the Italian Mafia. Serb and Montenegrin soldiers who had returned from the front-lines of the Yugoslav wars found the only way to make a profit was by turning to a life of crime. The most common crimes were assassinations, kidnappings, drug and cigarette trafficking, robberies, money laundering, racketeering and illegal software production. In 1998, 350 kilograms of heroin were seized at the Serbian-Bulgarian border.

On 15 January 2000, Arkan was assassinated in the lobby of the Continental Hotel in Belgrade. Slobodan Milošević was dethroned in the October 2000 Bulldozer Revolution. However, a bloody feud soon emerged among the different criminal "clans" of Belgrade. The feud grew into an open war in which many of the key Mafia bosses were assassinated. In 2000, some €841,000,000 was made in illegal profits in Serbia.

25 August 2000. Ivan Stambolić, former Serbian president was abducted in Belgrade, just before the federal election in which it was mentioned that he could be included as a candidate for the President of the FRY, and since then he disappeared without a trace. The remains of Stambolić were discovered on 28 March 2003. He was killed on the same day he had been hijacked by members of the Zemun clan. The funeral was on 8 April.

By the early 2000s, the Serbian mafia reportedly had more money than the Serbian government and was better armed than the Serbian Army and Serbian police, according to Serbian Interior Minister Dušan Mihajlović, who claimed Slobodan Milošević had given life to crime-syndicates as a "state-sanctioned mafia". Prostitutes from Russia, Belarus and the Ukraine were smuggled into Serbia. After Milošević fell from power, the Mafia began seeking a new contact in the government. In September 2001, 700 kilograms of heroin was found in a bank vault rented by the BIA in central Belgrade. The illegal safekeeping was never explained, nor brought up. In exchange for information about Kosovo Albanian terrorists, the Zemun Gang was provided "special training courses" by the Serbian Special Forces.

In 2011, Dr Gilly McKenzie, an Interpol Organized Crime Unit expert, compiled a "White Book" containing 52 criminal organizations of Serbia, none of which had been terminated by the year's end. In the same year, it was concluded that the Protection rackets in port cities on the Black Sea were run by Serbian, Russian and Ukrainian criminals.

Beginning with the Yugoslav wars and ending with the assassination of Prime Minister Zoran Đinđić in March 2003, connections between the mafia and the government were obvious and corruption was rampant in most branches of the government, from border patrols to law-enforcement agencies. On 12 March 2003, Đinđić was assassinated by a former Serbian Special Operations Unit member, Zvezdan Jovanović. "Legija" was also involved in the assassination and was sentenced to 50 years in prison.

Đinđić had connections within the Surčin Gang that dated back to the earlier overthrowing of Milošević. The government set in motion an operation against organized crime - "Operation Sabre", which led to more than 10,000 arrests. Many New Belgrade malls, locations frequented by gangsters, were closed after the Operation, 123 criminal groups were shattered with 844 members awaiting trial; 3,949 people had criminal complaints issued against them. 28 kilograms of heroin, 463 grams of cocaine, 44,837 kilograms of marijuana, 4,960 kilograms of synthetic drugs and 688 stolen cars were recovered in a single day. Milan Sarajlić, the Deputy State Prosecutor of Serbia was arrested that day and later confessed to being on the payroll of the Zemun clan.

In November 2003, 140 kilograms of marijuana were seized in Belgrade and 4 people were arrested. The Red Berets were dissolved on 23 March 2003. In 2005, it was confirmed that Serbia had lost 7,500,000 RSD daily due to economic crime, with the estimated total loss to criminal activity  being estimated to be approximately €200,000,000 yearly. In 2006, it was revealed that Dušan Spasojević, leader of the Zemun clan, was connected to Serbian Radical leader Vojislav Šešelj, to whom he had allegedly given information about high-profile murders carried out in Serbia, which Šešelj wrote about.

In January 2009, Serbian Interior Minister Ivica Dačić estimated that between 30 and 40 serious organized crime groups were operating in Serbia. The figures provided by Dačić did not include smaller criminal groups but more organized ones that were involved in drug and arms trafficking, human trafficking, murder and protection rackets.

In September 2009, 22 members of the Elez group were arrested by the Serbian police, dubbed the most dangerous gang in Western Balkans. The leader, Darko Elez, was captured with five other members in Serbia. 13 others were captured in Bosnia, including three police officers. Police seized 2.8 tons (2,800 kg, worth 120 million €) of cocaine shipment from Uruguay on 17 October 2009, the BIA and American DEA made the joint operation. On 31 October 2009, Serbian police arrested over 500 people in the biggest anti-drug bust ever in Serbia.

The Interior Ministry organized the Morava-operation that would focus on drug trafficking to young people in the primary and secondary schools, clubs and cafes and would encompass 2,000 police officers searching the whole country.

In November 2009, Argentine police arrested five Serbian drug couriers and seized their 492 kilograms of cocaine in Buenos Aires, One of the largest drug busts in 2009. The routes of the drugs were from Uruguay and Argentina via Central alt. South Africa to Northern Italy alt. Turkey to Montenegro. Serbian organized crime experts estimated 10,000 foot soldiers part of 5 major organized crime groups operating in Serbia. A courier package of 5 kilos cocaine was intercepted from Paraguay, 4 Serbs from Belgrade were arrested. The busts were part of the Operation Balkan Warrior; an international drug smuggling case that involves mainly the Zemun clan, led by, among others, Željko Vujanović.

In December 2009, Interior Minister Ivica Dačić said "half of the Serbian sport clubs are led by people with links to organized crime". 21 kilos of heroin ($1,5-million) were found in a Belgrade flat rented by a Montenegrin national. The drugs were brought from Turkey.

In January 2010, a  lot illegally owned by the Zemun clan was seized at Šilerova Street, Zemun, Belgrade, the clan's headquarters. By 21 January, the Balkan Warrior Operation included 19 suspects, 9 of whom were already in custody. New arrestees included Darko Šarić and Goran Soković. That same day, an 8-man crime group involved in stealing of oil over a two-year period from the NIS pipelines, the crude oil was sold through a company, worth several hundred thousands of euros, among the arrested is a member of the MUP.

On 10 February 2010, Serbian top officials said serious death threats from the narco-mafia have been directed against President Boris Tadić, Deputy Prime minister and Interior minister Ivica Dačić, Special prosecutor for organized crime Miljko Radisavljević, and other top government officials. On 18 February, a group of six robbers from Belgrade were arrested, they had since 2008 stolen more than 10 million RSD from banks, post offices, gas stations, exchange offices and stores.

On 19 February 2010, Interior Minister Dačić said more than 50 suspects were arrested today in an ongoing operation aimed against financial crime and money laundering conducted in Valjevo, Novi Sad, Belgrade, Šabac, Sremska Mitrovica, Čačak and Sombor.

In March 2010, Stanko "Cane" Subotić, head of the so-called "Tobacco mafia", accused Nebojša Medojević, the Montenegrin party leader of Movement for Change of having organized a manhunt for him. Medojević had claimed that Cane and Darko Šarić had been hiding in a Montenegrin police villa in Žabljak, while Cane said in an interview that he was in Geneva, Switzerland. On 11 March, a "well-known" entrepreneur  was arrested with 1.2 kilograms of heroin meant for resale in Jagodina.

On 19 March, Boris Tadić vowed all-out war on the Serbian mafia, in particular drug trafficking that is considered the biggest threat in society. He claimed to have evidence that Serbian cartels have attempted to penetrate state institutions to destabilise the government. "The latest property seizures prove that those groups have laundered narco money by investing not only into their personal houses and land but also in tourism, factories and distribution of the press", Tadić said. On 28 March 2010, two Bosnian Serbs from Novi Pazar were arrested at Zagreb Airport with at least 1.7 kilograms of cocaine for the Serbian drug market. The pure cocaine came from Lima, Peru where they had spent the month traveling from Belgrade. The drugs were worth an estimated €70,000 on the streets of Croatia.

In April 2010, it was concluded that Šarić's gang had planned an operation against Serbian officials, including the president. Encrypted messages in local newspapers were deciphered by investigators and after long surveillance of the clan it was concluded that several hitmen were to kill Serbian officials of the MUP, BIA and state officials in a synchronized and highly well-coordinated way. The Šarić clan wants to liquidate people that are in their way, after the Balkan Warrior Operation that heavily decreased crime in Serbia and Montenegro. On 14 May 2010, three Serbs who worked security for one of Bolivia's top drug lords were killed in a shootout with rival crime groups; the drug lord  was kidnapped.

Dačić submitted the work report for 2009; the police had uncovered 7 OC groups and arrested 86 people. He said that by the end of 2009 there were 27 registered OC groups active, with each group having more than 200 members. There is/was an ongoing investigation against Zemun clan members involved in assassinations who claim Šešelj ordered the assassination of Tomislav Nikolić.

In 2010 it was revealed that the Šarić gang had, from 2008 to 2009, ousted the 'Ndrangheta from the drug market. With the emergence of the gang on Italian soil, the gang offered better quality cocaine for a lower price, effectively gaining the market from 2007 to 2009, trafficking cocaine from South America. Operation Balkan Warrior was successful in Italy, with over 80 people arrested. Two networks were among the arrested, one Italian, with members from Milan and other northern Italian towns, and the other, a Serbian network, with members from Serbia, Montenegro and Slovenia. The Serbian network has operatives all over Europe and South America.

Groups

Belgrade neighbourhoods
Novi Beograd gangs, organized in different Blokovi (neighbourhoods), during the 1990s the gangsters of New Belgrade were very successful but had after the Yugoslav wars been killed by each other.
Surčin clan, at the beginning car thefts, smuggling of petrol and cigarettes, moved on to narcotics. Had connections with officials in police, judiciary and politicians mostly prior to the Operation Sablja.
Zemun clan, Drug trafficking, contract-killing, abduction. Had connections with officials in police, judiciary and politicians mostly prior to the Operation Sablja. The head was Dušan Spasojević.
Šarić gang
Voždovac clan, led by Goran Vuković 
Zvezdara clan, led by Sredoje "Šljuka" Šljukić
Dorćol group, drug trafficking
Karaburma group, drug trafficking
Senjak group, known for drug trafficking, racketeering,
Janjičari group, led by Aleksandar "Sale Mutavi" Stankovic
Principi group, led by Veljko "Velja Nevolja" Belivuk

Other
Peca gang (19??-1992)
Arkan network († 2000)
Elez group (-2009)
Keka group
Belov clan
Serbian Brotherhood
Pink Panthers gang
YACS Yugoslavian Albanian Croatian Serbian crime group Manhattan NYC. (1970-1997)

Gang leaders and noted members
The reign of Slobodan Milošević represented the height of power of Serbian organized crime, when mafiosi and government officials were intertwined. The role of several Belgrade gangsters was described in the documentary film, Vidimo se u čitulji (See You in the Obituary).

Activity outside Serbia
The Pink Panthers international jewel thief network is responsible for some of the most audacious thefts in criminal history. They are responsible for what have been termed some of the most glamorous heists ever, with their crimes being thought of as "artistry" even by criminologists. They have targeted several countries and continents, and include Japan's most successful robbery ever among their thefts.

Interpol believes that the  YACS Crime Group that evolved into The 
PINK PANTHERS  are responsible for US$130 million in bold robberies in Dubai, Switzerland, Japan, France, Germany, Luxembourg, Spain and Monaco. Pink Panthers are believed to be responsible for the robbery of the jewellery store Harry Winston in Paris, on 9 December 2008. The thieves escaped with more than €80 million worth of jewellery. The total worth of jewellery that has been stolen by the Pink Panthers was 250 million € in May, 2010.

Australia
The first Serbian mafiosi came to Australia in the late 70s, organized in a Yugoslav clan, their headquarters were some 15 kafanas in Sydney, Wollongong and Melbourne.

Milivoje Matović (aka "Miša Kobra") arrived in Sydney in 1986 and became a known gambler who organized big games. His younger brother Braca owed money to the gang of Žorž Stanković, who sent his own son Batica after Matović. Batica was deported to Serbia and Braca was killed in the meantime. Žorž was killed in 1993 and his son Batica was killed in 1996.

In 2005 interviews with Australian Serbs, it was said some 20 Zemun clan members operated in Australia at the time, double the number working prior to Operation Sablja. Serbian boxer Božidar Cvetić who in 2002 was stabbed, now working as a bouncer in Australia said that Australian police had shown him pictures of some 150 Serbian criminals active in Australia.

In May 2007, Australian police saw recruitment to organized crime motorcycle gangs from young Serbs.

Austria
The Serbian mafia was the main operators of drug trafficking and cigarette smuggling in Austria in 2004 and Austria was the home to many Serbian gangs.

On 27 October 1978 Veljko Krivоkарić secretly met with Ljubomir Magaš, a member of the gang he had just left, at the Zur Hauptpost coffee house in Vienna. Magaš and another Yugoslav, Rade Ćaldović, grabbed Krivоkарić and fractured his skull with a glass bottle. Stevan Marković's body was found in garbage bags in 1968. He was the former bodyguard of Alain Delon. His godfather, Corsican gangster François Marcantoni, was under investigation for murder and spent 11 months in custody. The Pink Panthers have operated in Austria.

Belgium
In 1990, Kosovo Albanian activist Enver Hadri was assassinated in Brussels by Veselin "Vesko" Vukotić, Andrija Lakonić, and Darko Ašanin, at the time hired by the UDBA (Yugoslav intelligence).

Bosnia & Herzegovina
The Serbian mafia is the largest organized crime group in Bosnia & Herzegovina, operating out of Republic of Srpska. The Zemun clan is active in Bosnia.

Bulgaria
From 1994 to 1997, Zemun clan leader Dušan Spasojević used heroin supplies channels through Sofia. In 1997, 350 kilos of heroin was seized at the Serbian-Bulgarian border. Sreten Jocić (aka "Joca Amsterdam") escaped from custody in Netherlands in 1993; he left for Bulgaria where he would continue his drug smuggling under the pseudonym "Marko Milosavljević" (which happens to be the same name as a noted Serbian football player). He was arrested in 2002 and extradited to the Netherlands.

One Macedonian national and 2 Bulgarians were arrested during the Operation Moonlight linked with the Zemun clan; they trafficked cocaine from Bolivia.

Zemun clan member Nenad "Milenko" Milenković was arrested in 2003 at the Varna resort, following the international warrant by the Serbian police after Operation Sablja. He was suspected of orchestrating at least three murders in Bulgaria and some 20 in Serbia. The Zemun clan successfully managed the drug traffic from Bulgaria after 2003, taking over the market from Surcin-associate Sreten Jocić.

It has been alleged that Bulgarian tycoon Iliya Pavlov was murdered by the Serbian mafia in 2004 and had owed 250 million dollars to Milosević era government figures.

Croatian hitman Robert Matanić and his colleagues were hired by the Zemun clan to kill members of the competing Bulgarian mafia for the Balkan drug route. Dimitar Hristov, Kaloyan Savov and Zhivko Mitev were killed in a shootout on 4 June 2004. Matanić and his men were hired by Milcho Bonev  as bodyguards. Matanić was arrested and detained in Bulgaria. Milcho Bonev was assassinated in 2004, believed to be organized by the Serbian Mafia.

In September 2007, what appeared to be an internal feud resulted in the death of Jovica Lukić and the critical wounding of two other men as well as a mother and her baby. The men were all members of the Zemun clan. Former Litex president Angel Bonchev had business with the Zemun clan. He was kidnapped in 2008. The Zemun clan is active in Bulgaria.

Czech Republic
In the 1990s, Serbian organised groups were one of the leading syndicates operating in the Czech Republic. A letter was sent to Czech newspapers containing information on a supposed future assassination of President Havel by 4 or 5 members and their whereabouts. The letter, written in broken Czech, was thought by police to have been sent by a rival gang.

Denmark
Serbian-Danish actor Slavko Labović, who played Radovan in the film Pusher, was arrested, along with his brother, for possession of illegal arms (loaded gun) in Sweden. He was the director of the RK Company in Denmark, an illegal gambling company owned by Rade Kotur (Spelkungen, The Gambling King) a known figure in Sweden who hired the murder of Ratko Đokić.

Finland
Human trafficking and illegal immigration was growing in Finland has been orchestrated by Serbian organized crime groups since 2004.

France
Known in French as Mafia Serbe. In 1962, Stevica Marković, Miša Milošević and Radovan Delić arrived in Paris, were part of the "Garderodameri" that was formed in 1966 with the arrival of Marko Nicovic.

The Pink Panthers have operated in France. In October 2008, police officials in Monaco arrested two members of the gang, a Serb and a Bosnian Serb. The gang is suspected of jewellery and gems theft at Harry Winston for an estimated value of up to 80 million Euros or 105 million US dollars.

Greece
After the Yugoslav wars, Kristijan Golubović worked in Greece. In 2002, he escaped from Malandrino, a Greek prison where he had been serving fourteen and a half years for stealing two Mercedes-Benz cars and an armed robbery. In December 2009, two Serbs were arrested suspected of involvement of a major group smuggling cocaine from Peru to Montenegro on luxury yachts. The United States DEA helped the Greek police track the smuggling for five months. Two other Serbs  were also wanted in Serbia in connection with this.

Germany

Known in German as the German: Serbische Mafia, Jugoslawische Mafia. The Serbian mafia was the main operator of cigarette smuggling in Germany in 2004. Ljubomir Magaš ("Ljuba Zemunac", "Ljuba from Zemun", "The Godfather") was the head of the Serbian mafia at the time. He was killed by two shots to the heart from close range in front of a courthouse in Frankfurt, Germany in 1986 by Goran Vuković "Majmun", a member of the Vozdovac clan, who himself survived five murder attempts following the killing before he was assassinated in downtown Belgrade in broad daylight in 1994. Slobodan "Slobo" Grbović left Italy for Germany in the 1970s and became friends with Vaso Letećeg, a thief from Belgrade. In 1981, the friendship ended in a feud over money, Slobo shot and wounded Letećeg and went to prison.

In 1980, Branislav Saranović  escaped Wuppertal prison with the help of the Ljuba Zemunac gang who blew up a prison wall. In February 1988, Rade Caldović is appointed the leader in Germany after good relations with the Italian mafia in Milan. He became friends with Greek businessman Mihail Sainidis, who owns casinos in southern Germany. On 30 March, Zoran Lucić, a Belgrade gangster, killed an Albanian rival in Frankfurt.

In the 1990s, the underground of former Eastern Germany was controlled by Italian, German, Russian, Vietnamese and Serbian organized groups. Leipzig was the centre of money laundering, smuggling, prostitution and protection rackets due to the weak system. The most profitable operations of the groups from former Yugoslavia was car thefts, luxury cars were stolen in Germany and sold to Eastern Europe, North Africa and Far East.

Andrija Drašković, an heir to Arkan's syndicate following the latter's assassination, was arrested by German police in Frankfurt after four years on the run from the Italian Anti-Organized Crime Unit. Drašković is believed to have organized the murder of his former boss, Arkan.

Hungary
The main organized crime groups in Hungary in 2004 were the Bulgarian and Serbian mafias.

Romania
In 2019 the Romanian police arrested two Serbian citizens after finding more than a ton of high-quality cocaine on the Black Sea coast that was clearly intended for transit across the country.

Italy
Dado "Metko" Cerović and Ibrahim "Belo" Habibović were the most powerful Yugoslav criminals in Milan before moving to Genova. In 1971 Ljubomir Magaš arrived in Italy with "Dača" and settled in Milan. His friend, Rade "Centa" Ćaldović was shot in his stomach in Verona by a rival, Bata Glavac. Ćaldović was later sent to a Rome prison. The Yugoslav mafia in Milan was formed by Magas, Arkan, Ćaldović, Veljko Krivоkарić, Slobodan "Slobo Crnogorac" Grbović, Milan Civija, Dule Milanović, Mile Ojdanić, Sava Somborac, Pera Oziljak, Marinko Magda, and Đorđe "Giška" Bozović. They carried out holdups, murders and burglaries in Trieste, Rome, and Milan.

Ibrahim "BELO" (called "Drago lo Belo" in Italian) was a Serbian gangster who found his way to Milan, he was connected with a godfather of the Italian Mafia in Calabria. He was involved with gambling, bank and jewellery robberies. An influx of gangsters from SR Montenegro strengthened the Yugoslav position in the Italian underworld. Đorđe Božović, Vlasto Petrović Crnogorac, and Darko Ašanin were connected with mafiosi operating from Montenegro; Branko and Slobodan Šaranović, Brano Mićunović and Ratko "Cobra" Đokić, Sarajevo; Miša Martinović, Zagreb; Marko Vlahović. In the same time Slobodan Grbović (aka "Slobo Crnogorac") left for Germany and teamed up with Vaso Letećeg, a thief from Belgrade.

During the 1990s the 'Ndrangheta acquired weapon arsenal (Bazookas, explosives, automatic firearms) built in Serbia, imported through firms outside Italy. From 1994 to 2000 illegal cigarette smuggling in Italy was operated by the Serbian mafia together with the Italian Mafia.

Zemun clan member Ninoslav Konstantinović fled the Netherlands to Italy after his brother was arrested in 2003. In Italy he became a leading heroin distributor and professional hitman, working for the Italian Mafia in Naples, he is recognized as highly skilled as many of his fellow Zemun clan members are known throughout Europe.

In May 2009, Vladimir Jovanović, a former Zemun clan member and Interpol wanted was arrested in Italy.

The presence of Serbian OC groups, among others, have increased rapidly the later years because of the badly controlled coastline.

Luxemburg
International burglary networks were present in 2004, mainly from Southeastern Europe (the Balkans).

Montenegro
Montenegro was in a state union with Serbia from 1991 to 2006. The Serbian mafia is the leading criminal group in Montenegro. Many of the Belgrade crime groups that were not caught during Operation Sablja hid in Montenegro. The Zemun clan is active in Montenegro.

Netherlands
There have been a number of unsolved murder cases in Rotterdam that have been linked to the activities of Serbian Organized Crime gangs. In recent years the Serbian mafia has been growing strong in the Netherlands. By 2004, ecstasy and heroin in Netherlands had originated from the Balkans.

Sreten Jocić (aka "Joca Amsterdam"), is a hitman and a drug dealer. He is considered the leader for the Serbian mafia in Amsterdam. On Christmas Eve, 1974, Slobodan Mitrić killed three alleged UDBA members in Amsterdam. In 1977, Emilio Di Giovine was wounded and two of his men killed by rival Yugoslavs.

On 24 October 1979, Arkan, Slobodan Kostovski, and an unnamed Italian accomplice were arrested while robbing a jewelry store in Amsterdam, they had days earlier robbed a jeweller in Hague and were sought in several countries. On 8 May 1981, Arkan escaped from the Bijlmerbajes prison in Amsterdam with Sergio Settimo, an Italian national, one of the most sought-after criminals in Europe.

In 1992, a member of the Chinese Triad was killed after a debt to the Serbian Mafia. The Serbian OC groups have become stronger and has superseded the Russian Mafia in Netherlands and the arms trade is shared by Serbian and Turkish groups.

Norway
Non-Norwegian gangs and organized crime groups came to dominate Norway's drug trade in the 1980s. During the 1990s Norway saw a large influx of Yugoslavs seeking refugee status due to the conflict in the Balkan region.

Slovenia
Slovenia has witnessed a growing trend of human trafficking by Balkan organized crime groups since 2004. Serbian organized crime has operated the cigarette smuggling and arms trafficking.

Spain
A growing trend of auto theft was seen by southeastern European organized crime groups since 2004. Serbian organized crime groups grew their presence in Spain.

Sweden
Known in Swedish as: Serbiska maffian or Serbiska Brödraskapet, earlier Jugoslaviska maffian or Juggemaffian during the years of Yugoslavia. And more specifically known as the Serbian Brotherhood encompassing territory from Sweden to Denmark. The Serbian mafia or Serbian Brotherhood in Sweden was said to be the top criminal organisation, but its influence has declined since the deaths of several leading figures. A war was fought over the control of the trade of narcotics and cigarettes between Serbian Organized Crime leaders which resulted in the deaths of Joksa and Ratko Đokić.

Individuals associated to Serbian Organized Crime in Sweden include:

Ratko Đokić, "The Godfather", an arms dealer and cigarette smuggler; he was assassinated on 5 May 2003 by Serbian hitmen hired by Rade Kotur, another notorious Serbian criminal. 
Dragan "Jokso" Joksović, notorious gambler and assumed cigarette smuggler, was murdered on 4 February 1998 in Solvalla, Stockholm by a Finnish hitman hired by "Kova". He was a close friend of Arkan and is said to have helped Arkan on many occasions. Arkan and many other known mafia figures attended his funeral. As revenge, "Kova" was later killed in front of 60 guests on Arkan's orders.
Milan Ševo, declared to be the last Head of the Serbian mafia in Sweden. He has survived numerous murder attempts. In 2004, he escaped from prison. He married Ratko Đokić's daughter. 

Sweden saw a large influx of ethnic Serbs during the 1960s/70s, when the "Arbetskraftsinvandring" took place; The labour force of immigrants who were granted citizenship (similar to Gastarbeiter programme). In the 1980s the Serbs were the main operators of drug smuggling in Sweden.

In 2003, in a storage room located in the Vårby Gård suburbs, the Swedish police found silenced firearms; Ak47s, Uzis, MP5s, grenades, plastic explosives and mines. The arsenal was used by the Serbian Mafia in Sweden, the owner of the storage was Milan Ševo, son-in-law of Ratko Đokić, former head of the Serbian mafia. This title was soon inherited by Ševo. On 5 May 2003, Đokić was assassinated outside his boxing club in Skärholmen. One of the hitmen, Nenad Mišović, was arrested in Europe years later. Mišović came to Sweden in 2002 after fleeing the police in Serbia. He was hired by Rade Kotur, a rival of Đokić In 2004, the Serbian mafia dominated the organized crime in Sweden, known uncovered operations were doping substances.

One of the chapters in the book, Svensk Maffia (Swedish Mafia) follows the history of the Serbian mafia in Sweden from the 1960s to the present. Serbian Interior Minister Ivica Dačić claims former members of the paramilitary Red Berets took part in the 2009 Västberga helicopter robbery one of the most spectacular heists in the history. One month prior to the robbery, the Swedish Embassy in Serbia was allegedly given "certain information about a criminal group which was preparing a robbery" by Serbian police.

United Kingdom
On 2 June 2009, six Serbs were convicted, together with several Israelis, in smuggling of 12.5 ton (£36m) marijuana, orchestrated by the Israeli mafia. The marijuana was seized as it travelled from Larache, Morocco to Southampton on a tugboat under an Israeli flag. The Pink Panthers have operated in London.

United States
There has been known involvement of Balkan crime groups in the United States. One of the most notorious Serbs that arrived  in New York City  1956 was Vojislav Stanimirovic, aka MR Stan, criminal turned journalist. He was responsible for the Vizcaya Heist. His son, Pavle Stanimirović, continued the tradition. The best known is Boško Radonjić, leader of the Irish-American organized crime group "the Westies", and the left hand of LCN boss of bosses John Gotti from 1988 to 1992.

In popular culture
The Serbian mafia has appeared in a number of films, novels and video games. They have appeared in:

In film
 Absolute 100 (2001), Serbian drama/thriller, young and talented sport shooter decides to get revenge on gangsters who destroyed the life of his brother
 Assault on Precinct 13 (2005), American action thriller
  (2016), German TV film about an undercover cop infiltrating the Serbian sportsbet mafia in Germany
Beck – Kartellen, Swedish crime thriller, about the case of a murdered restaurant owner
Bröderna Jaukka, Swedish short film
 The Crew (2008 film), British drama/dark comedy
Do koske, Serbian crime/action/dark comedy
In China They Eat Dogs, Danish action-comedy, about a debt to Serb gangsters
In Order of Disappearance, Norwegian action/dark comedy depicting a war between Norwegian and Serbian gangsters
 South Wind, Serbian action film, about young Serbian car thieves chased by Serbian crime lord, corrupt police chief and Bulgarian gangsters 
Layer Cake, British action film with Daniel Craig 
Leo, Swedish drama, about the revenge of his wife's murder
 Klopka (2007), Serbian drama/thriller, set in post-Milošević era, it tells the story of a man who desperately needs money for his son's surgery, when a mysterious man appears offering money in exchange for the murder of a mafia boss
Mlad i zdrav kao ruža, widely considered to be a visionary movie, it was banned in communist Yugoslavia. It portrays a 1970s mobster who, supported by the Yugoslav secret service UDBA, rises to become a crime lord
Pusher trilogy, a series of Danish films illustrating and exploring the criminal underworld of Copenhagen.
Pusher, 1996 Danish crime thriller.
Pusher II, 2004 Danish crime thriller.
Pusher 3, 2005 Danish crime thriller.
Pusher, 2012 British remake of the 1996 Danish original.
Paradiset, Swedish drama/thriller
Rane, Serbian crime/drama/dark comedy, widely considered to be a cult classic
Ride Along, 2014 American action comedy
Snabba Cash, Swedish action, about criminal activities in Stockholm, one of the protagonists is a Serbian Mafia henchman
Snabba Cash II
Poslednji krug u Monci. A 1980s Belgrade criminal reaches Italy searching for a man who owes him money, but gradually becomes the leader of the Italian branch of Yugoslav/Serbian mafia 
Straight Business 2, Canadian International Short Film
Straight Business 3, Canadian International Short Film
The Sweeney, 2012 British action drama
The Fourth Man, Serbian action/thriller
Vidimo se u čitulji, Serbian documentary about the organized crime in Belgrade during the 1990s

On television
 Dosije: Beogradski klanovi (2014), docudrama series about Serbian mafia clans in Belgrade during the 1990s
 Dosije: Zemunski klan (2015), sequel to the popular docudrama series, it shows the rise and fall of Zemun Clan, one of the most powerful crime groups in Serbia's history.
 Gorki plodovi, Serbian TV series
 Grupa (2019), Serbian TV series about a group of young street dealers and Belgrade police force tracking them down
 Meso (2017), Serbian TV series about a former soccer player from Banja Luka who comes back to his home town and confronts his childhood friend, now a crime boss 
 Ubice mog oca, Serbian crime/action TV show, which shows ties between mafia, politicians, tycoons and corrupt policemen
 In the American TV series Power, the Serbian mafia, led by Jason Micic are major antagonists in seasons 2–6.
South Wind, connected with a movie, South Wind is about Belgrade criminals who are work with Bulgarian narco boss, later fights against him. Also, they are rivals with Montenegrin narco boss.

In literature
The First Rule, novel by Robert Crais. Author claims to portray Serbian mafia in the US accurately, however, there are many inaccuracies (Serbian mafia does not abide to the Russian "Thief in law" gangster code, and it never did).
Millennium (novel series) mentions Serbian mafia members on several occasions.

In video games
Grand Theft Auto IV, American 2008 open world action-adventure video game. The main protagonist, Niko Bellic, is a Yugoslav man involved in organised crime.

See also
 Crime in Serbia
 Serbian Brotherhood

References

Further reading
 Glenny, M. (2008). McMafia: A Journey Through the Global Criminal Underworld
  Lopusina, Marko (2003). Srpska Mafija (Serbian Mafia)

External links
 Darko Šarić profile, reportingproject.net
Joca Freed from jail
La Mafia Serba 
Serbian mafia face crack down
Analysis: Gangsters' paradise lost by Tim Judah, BBC

Mafia
Serbian-Australian culture
Organized crime by ethnic or national origin
Transnational organized crime
Organised crime groups in Australia
Organised crime groups in Austria
Organised crime groups in Belgium
Organized crime groups in Bosnia and Herzegovina
Organized crime groups in Bulgaria
Organized crime groups in the Czech Republic
Organised crime groups in Denmark
Organized crime groups in Finland
Organized crime groups in France
Organised crime groups in Germany
Organized crime groups in Greece
Organised crime groups in Italy
Organized crime groups in Montenegro
Organised crime groups in the Netherlands
Organised crime groups in North Macedonia
Organised crime groups in Norway
Organized crime groups in Serbia
Organised crime groups in Spain
Organized crime groups in Sweden
Organized crime groups in the United States